The Farne Group is a geologic group in England. It preserves fossils dating back to the Carboniferous period.

See also

 List of fossiliferous stratigraphic units in England

References
 

Carboniferous System of Europe
Carboniferous England